João Victor de Albuquerque Bruno (born 7 November 1988), known as João Victor, is a Brazilian professional footballer who plays as a defensive midfielder and captains the Indian Super League club Hyderabad.

Club career

Early career
Born in Olinda, Pernambuco, João Victor played in his country with Clube Náutico Capibaribe, Associação Desportiva São Caetano and Treze Futebol Clube, helping the first club promote to Série A in 2006. In 2009, he joined compatriot Luiz Felipe Scolari at Uzbekistan's FC Bunyodkor.

Mallorca
On 26 August 2010, both João Victor and fellow Brazilian Ratinho – his former teammate at Bunyodkor – signed a five-year deal with RCD Mallorca in Spain, following a successful trial. The former made his La Liga debut on 26 September in a 2–0 home win against Real Sociedad, and finished his first season with 32 games (21 starts) as the Balearic Islands side narrowly avoided relegation.

On 7 October 2012, after just 15 minutes of an eventual 1–2 home loss to Granada CF, João Victor ruptured the cruciate ligament on his right knee, being sidelined for the remainder of the campaign. He remained out of action until July 2014, and renewed his contract at the Iberostar Estadi for two further years on 21 August.

Later years
João Victor left for Cyprus in the summer of 2015, joining Anorthosis Famagusta FC. He rarely settled with any team or in any country after leaving four seasons later, representing in quick succession Umm Salal SC, OFI Crete F.C. and Hyderabad FC.

With João Victor acting as captain, Hyderabad won the 2021–22 edition of the Indian Super League. He contributed five goals to the feat.

Career statistics

Club

Honours
Bunyodkor
Uzbekistan Super League: 2009, 2010
Uzbekistan Cup: 2010

Hyderabad
Indian Super League: 2021–22

References

External links

1988 births
Living people
People from Olinda
Sportspeople from Pernambuco
Brazilian footballers
Association football midfielders
Campeonato Brasileiro Série A players
Campeonato Brasileiro Série B players
Clube Náutico Capibaribe players
Associação Desportiva São Caetano players
Treze Futebol Clube players
FC Bunyodkor players
La Liga players
Segunda División players
RCD Mallorca players
Cypriot First Division players
Anorthosis Famagusta F.C. players
Qatar Stars League players
Umm Salal SC players
Super League Greece players
OFI Crete F.C. players
Indian Super League players
Hyderabad FC players
Brazil youth international footballers
Brazilian expatriate footballers
Expatriate footballers in Uzbekistan
Expatriate footballers in Spain
Expatriate footballers in Cyprus
Expatriate footballers in Qatar
Expatriate footballers in Greece
Expatriate footballers in India
Brazilian expatriate sportspeople in Spain
Brazilian expatriate sportspeople in Cyprus
Brazilian expatriate sportspeople in Qatar
Brazilian expatriate sportspeople in Greece
Brazilian expatriate sportspeople in India